The Mt. Zion Male Voice Choir is a men's choir in Bermuda. 

The choir consists of 30 men who are members of the Mt. Zion African Methodist Episcopal Church. Most members are over age 50.The choir is directed by musician Terry Henry.  

The choir provide free concerts in Bermuda throughout July each year.  The choir has also traveled to the United States to put on concerts.  In June 2012 the choir was featured in concert at Bermuda's GospelFest.

Discography 
 Live at the Rubber Tree (2009) Independent
 Live at King Square (2010) Independent

Videography 
 Beyond The 4 Walls (2013) DVD

See also
 Music of BermudaChoirs

References

External links 
 Mt. Zion Male Voice Choir on facebook.com
 The choir on Mt. Zion's church website
 ALLEvents.in (Philadelphia) - Mt. Zion Bermuda's Internationally Recognized Male Chorus
 The West End Bermuda Attractions - Mt. Zion Male Voice Choir
 Mt. Zion Choir on BERNEWS (Bermuda's News & Culture Source)
 Mt. Zion Male Choir Philadelphia Debut - www.afrophilly.com
 http://www.royalgazette.com/article/20150627/ISLAND08/150629751

Bermudian choirs
Bermudian musical groups